is a Japanese light novel series written by Hisago Amazake-no and illustrated by Kurogin. The series tells the story of a young Japanese man who dies in a car accident and reincarnates as a child in an alternate world where magic and giant robots are real, dedicating himself since then to fulfill his longtime dream of building and piloting his own mecha. It originated as a web novel before being picked up for print publication by Shufunotomo.

A manga adaptation by Takuji Katō is published by Square Enix, and an anime television series adaptation by Eight Bit aired from July to September 2017.

Premise
The story begins when Tsubasa Kurata, a software engineer and hardcore mecha otaku from Japan dies in a car accident. He is later reborn in the fantastical Fremmevilla Kingdom, a medieval world where giant, powerful mechs called Silhouette Knights are used to fight against horrifying creatures called Demon Beasts.

Here, Kurata is reborn as Ernesti "Eru" Echavalier, the son of a noble family. Blessed with exceptional magical abilities and the memories of his past life, he enrolls at the Royal Laihiala Academy, an elite magic school where the pilots of the Silhouette Knights called Knight Runners are being trained to battle threats both from within and outside the kingdom. He later teams up with Adeltrud "Addy" Olter and her twin brother, Archid "Kid" Olter with the goal of piloting a Silhouette Knight of his own creation, something that has been unheard of for centuries.

Characters
 
Eru: 
Kurata: 
He is a boy obsessed with Silhouette Knights since childhood and wants to become a designer and build his own Silhouette Knight in order to protect his kingdom. Because of his short stature and androgynous looks, he often gets confused for a girl. Tsubasa was a Japanese programmer and a hardcore robots otaku, who was killed in a car accident and reincarnated as Eru in the new world, which explains Eru's own interest in Silhouette Knights. Thanks to his past life, Eru is a genius inventor that has created new inventions like a Gunblade-like magic rod that combines a sword and magic rod into one weapon.

She is one of Eru's childhood friends and an illegitimate noble. She and her brother initially intend to run away from home but are motivated by Eru's excellence and learned magic from him. Initially fond of Eru for his cute appearance, Addy came to develop strong feelings for him over time to a point where she finds it hard to be apart from him. She marries Eru at the end of Volume 9 of the light novel.

He is Addy's twin brother and another of Eru's childhood friend who also learn magic from him. Due to him and sister being illegitimate children of Marquis Serrati and his mistress, he does not get along with his father and his legal family, especially his older-half brother Baltsar who despises them as the latter fears their father might legitimize them and make Kid his heir. He forms a relationship with a princess by persuading as her knight.

Eru's senior and considered the top Knight Runner in the school. His Silhouette Knight is armed with a shield. Generally, his character frequently described and considered as consistently competent, but he often indicated his inflexible mind and conservative view.

One of Eru's seniors and a Knight Runner. He is rather arrogant but after running away during a fight against a behemoth, he changes his behavior and becomes more responsible. Since change of behavior, due to aftermath of a fight against a behemoth, he becomes rather aggressive for some period.

Another of Eru's seniors and a Knight Runner. She is filled with a determination to win.

A dwarf boy who wants to become a blacksmith and a friend of Eru.

A dwarf engineer in training who is friends with Eru.

The Laihiala Academy's Student Council President and Addy and Kid's older half-sister. Despite their illegitimate status, she treats Addy and Kid as part of her family. Like Addy, she loves to dote on Eru. After the graduation, she chose to go back to her father and become an assistant of her father who is a Marquis.

Eru's grandfather and principal of the Laihiala Knights Academy. Formally, he was an assistant of the old king who was one of his old classmates.

Eru's father and a Knight Runner.

Eru's mother who taught him magic.

Director of Silhouette Knight Laboratory and member of the Alv race.

Media

Web novel
Hisago Amazake-no began publishing the series as a web novel on the Shōsetsuka ni Narō website on 16 October 2010. As of 1 October 2021, ten novels have been published, comprising a total of 195 chapters.

Light novel
Publisher  acquired the series for print publication, and published the first volume with illustrations by Kurogin under their Hero Bunko imprint in January 2013. Eleven volumes have been released as of 29 November 2021.

Volumes

Manga
Artist Takuji Katō began serializing a manga adaptation of the novels in Square Enix's seinen manga magazine Young Gangan on 15 April 2016. Crunchyroll is publishing the manga digitally since 5 July 2017.

Volumes

Anime
An anime television series adaptation was announced via a wraparound band on the first volume of the manga on 24 September 2016. The anime aired from 2 July – 24 September 2017. It is directed by Yusuke Yamamoto at Eight Bit, with scripts written by Michiko Yokote, and music composed by Masato Kōda. Fhána performed the opening theme song "Hello!MyWorld!!" and Ayaka Ohashi performed the ending theme song "You & I". Crunchyroll streamed the anime, while Funimation had licensed the series in North America. Following Sony's acquisition of Crunchyroll, the dub was moved to Crunchyroll.

Reception
The manga and the light novels had a combined 1.5 million copies in print as of 16 March 2018.

References

External links
  at Shōsetsuka ni Narō 
  at Hero Bunko 
  at Young Gangan 
 
 Manga (Crunchyroll simultaneous publication)
 Anime (Crunchyroll simultaneous publication)
 

2013 Japanese novels
2017 anime television series debuts
Anime and manga based on light novels
AT-X (TV network) original programming
Crunchyroll anime
Eight Bit (studio)
Gangan Comics manga
Isekai anime and manga
Isekai novels and light novels
Japanese fantasy novels
Light novels
Light novels first published online
Mecha anime and manga
Fiction about reincarnation
Seinen manga
Shōsetsuka ni Narō
Television shows based on light novels